CPET may refer to:

 Cardiopulmonary exercise test, a cardiological test that measures the heart's ability to respond to external stress
 Concerted proton-electron transfer